Marloes and St. Brides (Welsh: Marloes a Sain Ffraid) is a community in the West Wales county of Pembrokeshire.

The main settlements are the villages of Marloes and St Brides. Both villages lie on the southern shore of St Brides Bay

The islands of Gateholm, Grassholm, Middleholm, Skomer, Skokholm and The Smalls lie in the community.

The community population taken at the 2011 census was 305.

References

External links
 Contact details for Marloes and St Brides Community Council

Communities in Pembrokeshire